Libochovice is a town in Litoměřice District in the Ústí nad Labem Region of the Czech Republic. It has about 3,400 inhabitants.

Administrative parts
Villages of Dubany and Poplze are administrative parts of Libochovice.

Geography
It lies on the Ohře river. It is situated in an agricultural landscape of the Lower Eger Table.

History
The first written mention of Libochovice is from 1336, when it was described as a market town with a fortress. In 1560, Libochovice became a town.

The first Jews came into the town probably in the second half of the 15th century. From the second half of the 16th century there was a strong Jewish community, but most of them died during the Holocaust, and the community was never renewed after the World War II.

Sights
Libochovice is known for the Libochovice Chateau. It is Rennaisance castle, created by reconstruction of the former Gothic fortress. The castle park was founded in 1686.

The Jewish community is reminded of the cemetery, founded in 1583, and of part of the original houses of the Jewish quarter. The synagogue from the second half of the 18th century was demolished in 1985 and is commemorated by a memorial plaque.

Notable people
Jan Evangelista Purkyně (1787–1869), anatomist and physiologist
Ábrahám Lederer (1827–1916), Czech-Hungarian educator and writer
Berta Fanta (1865–1918), intellectual and feminist
Eliška Purkyňová (1868–1933), politician
Václav Vacek (1877–1960), writer and politician, Mayor of Prague
Josef Kopta (1894–1962), writer and journalist

References

External links

 
Libochovice Castle 
Article about Libochovice Jews 

Cities and towns in the Czech Republic
Populated places in Litoměřice District
Shtetls
Holocaust locations in Czechoslovakia